"Hot Problems" is a song released by the musical group Double Take which consists of Drew Garrett and Lauren Willey.

Spread and reception
On April 17, 2012, the "Hot Problems" music video was featured on several news sites, and received negative reviews. The song has been called "the worst song ever", with some YouTubers claiming that the song is worse than Rebecca Black's "Friday".

Willey and Garrett's responses
"We don't think that we're that hot," the teens told ABC regarding their lyrics. Garrett and Willey also told ABC that they are "open" to careers as songwriters. The teens stated that they made the song because they wanted something funny to show to their friends and didn't mean anything from it. "We knew that we couldn't actually sing, so we decided to go for more of a talking singing", Garrett told the media outlet.

See also
 Friday (Rebecca Black song)
 List of music considered the worst

References

Dance-pop songs
Viral videos
2012 debut singles
2012 songs
2012 YouTube videos